3: The Dale Earnhardt Story is a 2004 television movie produced by ESPN that loosely depicted the life of NASCAR driver Dale Earnhardt. It chronicles his life from his humble upbringing in Kannapolis, North Carolina, throughout his career racing automobiles to include his rise to dominance in NASCAR, culminating with his death in the final lap of the 2001 Daytona 500. Its central theme focuses on the relationship between him and his father, Ralph Earnhardt, as well as the relationship between him and his youngest son, Dale Earnhardt Jr. It was first broadcast on December 11, 2004, and subsequently released on DVD. Barry Pepper was cast in the lead role to star as Earnhardt; giving a credible performance which earned him a nomination for a Screen Actors Guild Award for Outstanding Performance by a Male Actor in a Miniseries or Television Movie.

Many of the film's race scenes were filmed at Rockingham Speedway. The track had lost its races and at the time was used mostly as a test facility and driving school. Chad McCumbee, who portrayed Earnhardt Jr., later became a NASCAR driver in the Truck Series. He also raced alongside Dale Jr. himself at the Pocono 500, driving Kyle Petty's 45 car, as Petty was in the TNT broadcast booth.

Actors playing the part of the Flying Aces were Ray Everett, Greg Davis, David Brooks, Robbie Hicks, and Don Gyr.

Synopsis 
The film details the life of stock-car racing legend Dale Earnhardt. From an early age, Earnhardt learned about cars from his father Ralph, who worked at a mill to feed and clothe his family but also rebuilt jalopies in his garage and raced them at local events on weekends. Ralph, a minor legend in Southern stock-car racing, inspired Dale to follow his own passion for racing. After dropping out of high school to race, Dale started out in his father's shadow and struggled to establish himself for more than a decade, especially when tangling with legends in the sport such as Darrell Waltrip. Dale finally broke into NASCAR in the late '70s, and in time became the top prize money winner in NASCAR history. The lessons Dale learned from his father are revisited when Dale's own teenage son, Dale Jr., decides to take up racing at the age of 16.

Cast

Copyright infringement controversy
The script of this film was not approved by Earnhardt's widow, Teresa Earnhardt, and his family.  The film, although capturing the essence of Earnhardt, is inaccurate in many of the events seen in it.  Richard Childress, the former car owner and team owner of Earnhardt, sued ESPN for copyright infringement with its use of the "3" logo. In December 2005 the lawsuit was settled out of court.

References

External links
ESPN: 3

2004 television films
2004 films
American television films
American auto racing films
Documentary films about auto racing
Dale Earnhardt
ESPN Films films
Films directed by Russell Mulcahy
Films scored by Louis Febre
Films shot in North Carolina
NASCAR mass media
Sports films based on actual events
2000s sports films
Works subject to a lawsuit
2000s American films